Alvechurch is a large village and civil parish in the Bromsgrove district in northeast Worcestershire, England, in the valley of the River Arrow. The Lickey Hills Country Park is 2.5 miles (4 km) to the northwest. At the 2001 Census, the population was 5,316.

History

Alvechurch means "Ælfgyth's church". In the eighth century, Ælfgyth founded a church on the site of the church of St. Laurence.

King Offa of Mercia gave the land forming the parish to Bishops of Worcester in 780. The parish is mentioned in the Domesday Book of 1068 as Alvievecherche with a small population of under 20 people. In the 13th Century the Bishop of Worcester built a palace in the village, and a weekly market and an annual fair were established.

The Bishop's Palace was pulled down in the 17th century, the only remnants being part of the moat and a yew tree which formerly stood in the palace grounds.

From the 19th century to the mid-twentieth century there was a brick factory in the hamlet of Withybed on the edge of the village. Other local industries included nail and needle making.  Dellow cars were made in Alvechurch between 1949 and 1956.

Architecture
The village has a number of medieval half-timbered buildings, as well as many Georgian, Edwardian and Victorian buildings.

The church of St Laurence dates back to 1239. It is situated on high ground, and was probably the site of an earlier Mercian church, although nothing remains of the earlier wooden building. Much of the church was rebuilt between 1858 and 1861 by William Butterfield. There is a 1,348-pipe organ.  The tower has a peal of eight bells, rung regularly by the North Worcestershire and District Change Ringing Association. The Ark, a £1m extension to the church was built in 2005 despite a village referendum in February 2004 voting against the erection of the building.

There are also many newer residential buildings and a First and Middle school with library. In 2008 a new first and middle school were built north-east of the village, the old school has since sadly been demolished and the new estate has road names commemorating the house names of the school.

Arts and entertainment
There is an attractive arts and crafts style Baptist church in the centre of the village.

There is also a renowned local amateur dramatic group, the Alvechurch Drama Society which produces two plays per year at the village hall. 
 The group is celebrated for its original pantomimes which are written by Chris Davies and Paul Chamberlain.

Alvechurch Sports and Social Club hosts live music on a regular basis and is home to Alvechurch Acoustic Roots a curated music event which welcomes performers from the local area and beyond.

Sport 
The football team that serves the village is Alvechurch F.C., which was founded in 1929 and played in the local park prior to a move to Lye Meadow. They reached the Third Round of the FA Cup in 1974, losing 4–2 to Bradford City, the club was at its greatest in the 80's when it spent a large stint in the Southern League Premier. In November 1993 they folded, but a group of supporters resurrected the club in 1994, in the 2002–03 season the club gained promotion to the Midland Football Alliance, now known as the Midland Football League Premier, and won the division in the 2016–17 season. In the 2017–18 season, they finished 2nd in the Evo-Stik Northern Premier League Division 1 South, gaining promotion to the 3rd tier of the non league pyramid. As of the 2018–19 season they play in the Evo-Stik Southern Football League Central Premier.

The village also has a local cricket team.

Travel and transport
The M42 motorway runs across the north side of the village; the nearest junction is north of the village at Hopwood, junction 2.

Alvechurch railway station, opened in 1859, is on the Cross-City Line. It provides local trains to Redditch and Lichfield via Birmingham. The station is unmanned. On 1 September 2014, a passing loop and second platform were completed and officially opened.

The village is accessible by narrowboat along a rural canal. Alvechurch Marina is on the Worcester and Birmingham Canal (built 1789), just across a hedgerow from the station.

The A441 road used to pass through the village, but now a relief road by-passes the village, helping to reduce traffic and pollution. Recently, specific traffic-calming measures have been added to the village's main thoroughfares. These 'pinch-points' reduce the road width to one raised central lane, preventing drivers from speeding and promoting considerate road use.

Alvechurch F.C. play their home games at Lye Meadow on Redditch Road.

Famous people
Alvechurch is the birthplace of Fay Weldon the novelist and Godfrey Baseley, creator of The Archers.
Alan Smith who scored the winning goal for Arsenal in the 1994 Cup Winners' Cup final played for Alvechurch F.C.
Lord Digby Jones lived in Alvechurch; his parents owned a shop in the village.
Home of Tracie Andrews who murdered Lee Harvey in 1996 in a high-profile case which Andrews initially blamed on a 'road rage' killer

References

External links

Alvechurch Parish Council
A description of the village
Seven fine pen & ink studies of Alvechurch buildings
2001 Census Statistics
 

Villages in Worcestershire